Gordon Allen Abbott (26 September 1914 – 19 April 1986) was an Australian rules footballer who played with Geelong and Essendon in the Victorian Football League (VFL).

Football
Debuting with Geelong in 1936, Abbott spent three years with the club which included being a member of Geelong's 1937 premiership team and kicking two goals in the Grand Final. He played mostly as a Ruckman and a forward. 

After a period out of the VFL he returned to the league in 1941 and joined Essendon where he would play in two further premierships, in 1942 and 1946.

Notes

References
 Maplestone, M., Flying Higher: History of the Essendon Football Club 1872–1996, Essendon Football Club, (Melbourne), 1996.

External links 
 

1914 births
1986 deaths
Australian rules footballers from Hobart
Australian Rules footballers: place kick exponents
Essendon Football Club players
Essendon Football Club Premiership players
Geelong Football Club players
Geelong Football Club Premiership players
Lefroy Football Club players
Tasmanian Football Hall of Fame inductees
Three-time VFL/AFL Premiership players